Regat Germans or Old Kingdom Germans ( or ) are an ethnic German group of the eastern and southern parts of Romania. The Regat is a Romanian-language term ascribed for the initial territorial extent of the Kingdom of Romania before the World War I (which, almost entirely, remained the same afterwards as well to the present-day). 

Consequently, this territory includes Western Moldavia, Northern Dobruja, Muntenia, Oltenia, and the Hertsa region (now in Chernivtsi Oblast, southwestern Ukraine). Most of the Regat German population was re-settled in the mid 20th century during World War II through the Heim ins Reich national socialist population transfer policy. Nowadays, the remaining Regat Germans, as all other German groups in Romania, are represented in local and central politics by the Democratic Forum of Germans in Romania (FDGR/DFDR). The Regat Germans are part of the Romanian Germans.

Population transfers to Nazi Germany 

As part of the Nazi-Soviet population transfers and the Heim ins Reich ("Home into the Empire") population transfer policy, Nazi Germany called ethnic Germans abroad to settle in the former Polish territories. Consequently, 77,000 Regat Germans were resettled in those regions in 1940.

Ethnic Germans from Romania resettled by Nazi Germany between 1939–1944

See also 

 Dobrujan Germans

References

Further reading 

 Hans Liebhart, Deutsche in Bukarest - Zwei-drei Jahrhunderte erlebter Geschichte, ADZ Verlag, Bukarest 2003
 Hans Liebhart, In Bukarest und Altrumänien - Deutsche Spuren noch und noch, ADZ Verlag, Bukarest 2006
 „Aus fünf Jahrzehnten. Geschichte der Deutsch-Evangelischen Gemeinde Turn-Severin 1861-1911“, Tip. E.J. Knoll, Turnu – Severin, 1911 in Evangelisches Zentralarchiv in Berlin (ZA 5091 / 107), Signatur: EZA Bibl. 81/154 in „Echo der Vortragsreihe“, Nummer 12/2007, Reschitz, 2007
 Zentralarchiv der Evangelischen Kirche A.B. in Rumänien in Kultur- und Begegnungszentrums "Friedrich Teutsch", Hermannstadt, Abtl. Kirchengemeinden, Bestand 179, Turn – Severin
 Dănescu, Constantin, „Şantierul Naval din Turnu Severin”, Band 1, (1851 – 1950), Prier Verlag, Turn – Severin, 2004
 Klein, Karl Kurt, Urkunden zur Geschichte evangelisch deutscher Diasporagemeinden im 19. Jahrhundert, Hermannstadt, Krafft & Drotleff, 1927
 Klein, Karl Kurt, Geschichte der Jassyer deutsch-evangelischen Gemeinde (mit einem Überblick über den Protestantismus in der Moldau im XVI. u. XVII. Jahrhundert), Hermannstadt, 1924
 Hering, Julius, Annalen der römisch-katholischen Pfarrei von Turn - Severin, in „Echo der Vortragsreihe“, Nummer 12/2006, Reschitz, 2006
 Louie, de Bie, „Die Römisch – Katholische Gemeinde zu Turn – Severin, ist sie oder nicht unabhängig?“, Tip. E.J. Knoll, Turnu – Severin, 1889
 Raymund Netzhammer: Bischof in Rumänien. Im Spannungsfeld zwischen Staat und Vatikan. Bd. I. und II. Hrsg. von Nikolaus Netzhammer in Verbindung mit Krista Zach, München 1996
 Povești din folclorul germanilor din România by Roland Schenn, Corint publishing house, 2014 (in Romanian)

External links 

  Die Allgemeine Deutsche Zeitung
 The Romanian Government's Department for Inter-Ethnic Relations

Dobruja
Ethnic German groups in Romania